Kandry-Kutuy (Qandra-Qotoy) is a rural locality (a selo) in Kandrinsky Selsoviet, Tuymazinsky District, Bashkortostan, Russia. The population was 651 as of 2010. There are 12 streets.

Geography 
Kandry-Kutuy is located 37 km southeast of Tuymazy (the district's administrative centre) by road. Starye Kandry is the nearest rural locality.

References 

Rural localities in Tuymazinsky District